Yassine Chamakhi (born 27 February 1995) is a Tunisian professional footballer who plays as a midfielder for Club Africain and the Tunisian national team.

Professional career
Chamakhi made his professional debut with Olympique Béja in a 3-0 Tunisian Ligue Professionnelle 1 loss to Club Africain on 25 September 2016.

International career
Chamakhi made his professional debut for the Tunisia national football team in a 1-0 friendly loss to Algeria on 26 March 2019.

References

External links
 
 
 

1995 births
Living people
Tunisian footballers
Tunisia international footballers
Club Africain players
Olympique Béja players
Tunisian Ligue Professionnelle 1 players
Association football midfielders